Finn Hawkins (born 10 December 2002) is a British windsurfer. He won a bronze medal at the 2018 World U21 Sailing Championships in Liepāja and a bronze medal, and Team GB's first, at the 2018 Summer Youth Olympics in Buenos Aires. Hawkins placed 26th overall in the 2020 iQFoil European Championships in Silvaplana, Switzerland, and first within the youth section. He also won the U19 section of the 2020 iQFoil International Games at Lake Garda in Italy. Hawkins won Men's U21 gold in the inaugural IQFoil World Championships in Silvaplana.

References

External links
 
 

2002 births
Living people
English windsurfers
English male sailors (sport)
Sailors at the 2018 Summer Youth Olympics
People educated at Truro School
Sportspeople from Cornwall